Merimnetria straussiella is a moth of the family Gelechiidae. It was first described by Otto Herman Swezey in 1953. It is endemic to the Hawaiian island of Oahu.

Adults have predominantly orange-colored forewings and pale hindwings.

The larvae feed on Straussia kaduana and Straussia mariniana. They mine the leaves of their host plant.

References

External links

Moths described in 1953
Merimnetria
Endemic moths of Hawaii